Kenneth Earl Rice (September 14, 1939 – October 14, 2020) was an American professional football player who was an offensive tackle in the American Football League (AFL) for the Buffalo Bills, Oakland Raiders, and the Miami Dolphins. Rice played college football for the Auburn Tigers, where he was named a two-time All-American.

Early years
Ken Rice was born in Attapulgus, Georgia on September 14, 1939 and moved to Bainbridge before high school. At Bainbridge High School, Rice played football, basketball, baseball, and took part in track and field. In track and field, Rice was a three-time state champion in shot put, a state champion in the discus throw and participated in relay races.

Rice received offers from FSU, Tennessee and Georgia Tech. Eventually, Rice chose to attend Auburn.

College career
Rice attended Auburn University from 1957 to 1960, playing for the Tigers on both the offensive and defensive lines. As a sophomore in 1958, Rice was named to the SEC's All-Sophomore Team as the Tigers posted a 9–0–1 record. Rice was named an All-American in 1959 and was voted the best offensive lineman in the SEC. In his senior season, Rice was once again named an All-American and was once again voted the best offensive lineman in the SEC. Rice was also voted the best defensive lineman in the conference that year.

In 1992, Rice was elected into Auburn's Team of the Century by fans. Rice also lent his name to the Ken Rice Award, an annual award given to the best offensive lineman at Auburn.

Professional career
Rice was drafted in the first round in both the 1961 NFL Draft and the 1961 AFL draft. Rice played for seven years for the Buffalo Bills, Oakland Raiders, and the Miami Dolphins, playing in 79 games total. In 1961 during his rookie season, he was selected to the 1961 AFL All-Star game. He was also named a second-team All-AFL lineman that season. 

In 1964, Rice was traded to the Oakland Raiders. In 1966, the Miami Dolphins drafted Rice from the Raiders during the 1966 AFL Expansion Draft. Rice retired from football after the 1967 season due to a back injury. He was inducted into the Georgia Sports Hall of Fame in 1989.

Personal life
Rice resided in Big Canoe, Georgia, where he had been involved in real estate development since the early 1970s. Rice met Billie Ann Perrin while attending Auburn and the two married on June 20, 1959. The couple purchased the summit of Mount Oglethorpe, the original southern terminus of the Appalachian Trail, in 1995, and opened the summit to the public in 2014. Billie Ann Rice died on June 7, 2014, at age 77.

See also
Other American Football League players

References

External links
Ken Rice stats at NFL.com

1939 births
2020 deaths
People from Bainbridge, Georgia
All-American college football players
Players of American football from Georgia (U.S. state)
American football offensive tackles
American football offensive guards
Auburn Tigers football players
Buffalo Bills players
Oakland Raiders players
Miami Dolphins players
American Football League All-Star players
American Football League players